Marcus Rayden Cabais (born August 31, 2009), also known mononymously as Marcus, is a Filipino singer and actor. He is known for his participation in Dream Maker, a Filipino-South Korean boy group survival reality show produced by ABS-CBN Entertainment, MLD Entertainment, and KAMP Global. He is a member of the show's resulting boy group HORI7ON.

Early life and education 
Marcus Rayden Cabais was born in Bataan, Philippines on August 31, 2009.

Career

Early projects 
Marcus Cabais started his career as an entertainer at 5 years old. In 2015, he joined It's Showtime'''s segment "Mini Me", playing a mini-version of American singer-songwriter Bon Jovi. He came back in the second season of the segment two years after as a Wildcard performer. Cabais also auditioned the SM Little Stars 2016 in SM City Pampanga and became the season's grand champion.

At 9, Cabais performed as Young Simba in The Lion King musical shown in different countries. In the same year, he joined Team Yey!, a Philippine children's television show created by Yey!, wherein he showcased his talent in music during the "Sound Check" segment.

Released on May 9, 2018, Cabais was cast in Regal Films' My 2 Mommies, directed by Eric Quizon. He played the role of Tristan, the son of actors Paolo Ballesteros and Solenn Heussaff. Despite his film debut, Cabais was praised in his performance. Joseph Atilano of the Philippine Daily Inquirer particularly stated that he played the central part in the film. He commented: "This confident, cool, smart kid was the glue that held this movie together... the plot of the movie is about his character. Marcus Cabais will pleasantly surprise you at how good he carried himself throughout as if he was already a veteran of many movies. He acts as though there were no cameras in front of him. And he can speak fluent English and French..."

 Dream Maker and HORI7ON 

In 2022, Cabais participated in Dream Maker'', a reality competition show broadcast on ABS-CBN which produces a boy band from a field of 62 contestants. Cabais took the rank 1 seat on the pilot episode of the show, bumping off Vinci Malizon, and was able to stay on the top spot for a long time. Korean mentor Bae Yoon-jung commented: "At your age, I didn't expect that you are that good". He was then 13 years old and the youngest contestant in the show.

Marcus Cabais consistently ranked high and stayed within the Top 7 in every ranking announcement, allowing him to advance to the finals. He is known for finishing second in the final episode and becoming part of the project boy group HORI7ON under MLD Entertainment.

Filmography

Theatre

Film

Television

References

External links

2009 births
Living people
Filipino singers
Filipino male child actors
Filipino male dancers
People from Bataan